Marsimik La or Marsemik La, also called Lankar La, elevation  is a high mountain pass in the Chang Chenmo Range in the Indian union territory of Ladakh,  east of Leh as the crow flies. Ladakh's route to the Chang Chenmo Valley traverses the pass.

Geography 

The ridge line of Marsimik La divides the basin of the Pangong Lake from the Chang Chenmo River.

About 4 km to the east of Marsimik La is another ridge line with the pass Kiu La (also called Kangseng La). Via this pass lies the Ladakhi route to the valley of Chang Parma (also called Changlung Lungpa), leading to the Khurnak Plain in the middle of the Pangong Lake.

The description of Marsimik La in the Gazetteer of Kashmir and Ladak (1890) states:

Sino-Indian border 

Transportation 
The Marsimik La Road from Lukung to Pamzal, constructed by India's Border Roads Organisation, traverses the pass. It is regarded as one of the highest motorable passes in the world.

References

Bibliography 
 

Mountain passes of Ladakh
Mountain passes of the Himalayas